Marguerite Humeau (born 1986) is a French visual artist. She is living in London.

Early life and education 
She studied at the Royal College of Art. Her work focuses on communication between worlds.  She has called herself an "Indiana Jones in Google Times".

Career
Humeau had her first major solo show at the Palais de Tokyo in 2016, was part of the Manifesta in Zurich in 2016, and showed at Nottingham Contemporary and other major galleries and institutions including the Victoria and Albert Museum.

Lucy, from her Opera of Prehistoric Creatures, was included in The Universal Addressability of Dumb Things curated by Mark Leckey in 2013. She also resuscitated Cleopatra's voice singing a love song of her era for the Serpentine Galleries Extinction Marathon curated by Hans-Ulrich Obrist in 2014.

In 2017, she was awarded the Zurich Art Prize. "Birth Canal" at the New Museum in New York City (2018), was Humeau's first solo exhibition in the United States, and received a positive review in Sculpture magazine.

References

External links
Artist Website
 C L E A R I N G New York/Brussels Profile
 Review of FOXP2 at Palais de Tokyo in New York Times 
Interview with the Artist in AQNB
Berlin Art Link Interview
Exhibition in Palais de Tokyo
CURA Magazine
WIRED Magazine
Hans Ulrich Obrist: "What should we be worried about?"

Living people
1986 births
21st-century French sculptors
French women sculptors
French contemporary artists
21st-century French women artists
Alumni of the Royal College of Art
20th-century French women